Saturday People is the second studio album by Canadian pop duo Prozzäk. This album was only released in Canada, on 7 November 2000. The album was nominated for "Best Pop Album" at the 2002 Juno Awards.

Track listing

The verse medley for "It's Not Me It's You" is taken from "The Dance of the Sugar Plum Fairies" in Tchaikovsky's The Nutcracker Suite.

CD-Extra section
 Video clip: "Live Footage" (Hot Show concert)
 Video clip: The Prozzäk Story
 Music video: "Strange Disease"
 Music video: "Sucks to Be You"

Year-end charts

References 

2000 albums
Prozzäk albums